Șerbu is a Romanian surname that may refer to:

Gheorghe Vergil Șerbu (born 1949), Romanian politician and member of the European Parliament
Ieronim Șerbu (1911–1972), Romanian prose writer

See also 
Serbu Firearms, American manufacturer of firearms
Serbu Super-Shorty, a compact, stockless, pump-action shotgun chambered in 12-gauge

Romanian-language surnames